The Mexican Lucha libre, or professional wrestling promotion International Wrestling Revolution Group (IWRG) has produced and scripted a number of wrestling shows since their creation on January 1, 1996 by promoter Adolfo "Pirata" Moreno. In 2020, IWRG will produce an indetermined number of shows, all held at Arena Naucalpan.

2020 events

See also
 2020 in professional wrestling

References

External links

2020 in professional wrestling
professional wrestling
International Wrestling Revolution Group shows